The Small Arms Protective Insert (SAPI) is a ceramic ballistic plate used by the United States Armed Forces. It was first used in the Ranger Body Armor and Interceptor Body Armor, both are ballistic vests. It is now also used in the Improved Outer Tactical Vest as well as the Modular Tactical Vest, in addition to commercially available "plate carriers". The Kevlar Interceptor vest itself is designed to stop projectiles up to and including 9×19mm Parabellum submachine gun rounds, in addition to fragmentation. To protect against higher-velocity rifle rounds, SAPI plates are needed.

ESAPI

In May 2005, the U.S. Armed Forces began replacing the standard Small Arms Protective Insert plates with the Enhanced Small Arms Protective Insert (ESAPI). 
An ESAPI provides protection from .30-06 Springfield M2 armor-piercing (AP) with a steel penetrator in accordance with the NIJ Level IV standard, but costs about $600 per plate, 50% more than SAPI plates. They are produced by Ceradyne, BAE Systems, and ArmorWorks Enterprises.

XSAPI
A call for a next generation plate, to stop even greater velocity threats than the ESAPI plate was issued by the U.S. Army in 2008. The X Threat Small Arms Protective Insert plates are specifically allowed scalar or flexible systems, and asked for better coverage, with less than a pound of additional weight. XSAPI did in fact offer slightly better protection, at the cost of more weight and thicker armor profile.

The XSAPI is intended to protect against an "X-Threat", which is able to be inferred from another source to be the M993  7.62 NATO armor piercing projectile. In addition, there is record of the FBI utilizing the plate for their purposes in May 2011.

The plates were developed in response to a perceived threat of AP projectiles in Iraq and Afghanistan. Over 120,000 inserts were procured; however, the AP threats they were meant to stop never materialized, and the plates were put into storage.

Materials and capabilities 
The standard plate for the Interceptor body armor is made of boron carbide or silicon carbide ceramic.  The standard plates are not given an NIJ rating, as they are tested in accordance with specific protocols for the military and not the NIJ's testing.  Military testing calls for survivability of three hits from the round marked on the plate - for standard SAPI, of a caliber up to 7.62×51mm NATO M80 ball and of a muzzle velocity up to 2,750 ft/s (840 m/s). For ESAPI, a .30-06 Springfield M2 armor-piercing (AP) (.30-06 black-tip armor-piercing) cartridge.  This performance is only assured when backed by the soft armor of the OTV (or any soft armor which meets military requirements for protection). The ceramic plate is backed with a shield made of Spectra, a material up to 40% stronger than Kevlar, to trap any fragments of either plate or projectile and prevent them from injuring the wearer.

Sizes and weights 
SAPI plates meant for body armor come in front and back plates which are identical, and smaller side plates. The front and back plates come in five sizes. Their dimensions are the following:

Front and back SAPI plates:
Extra Small - 1.27 kg (2.8 lb) | 184 x 292 mm (7¼ x 11½ in)
Small - 1.59 kg (3.5 lb) | 222 x 298 mm (8¾ x 11¾ in)
Medium - 1.82 kg (4.0 lb) | 241 x 318 mm (9½ x 12½ in)
Large - 2.09 kg (4.6 lb) | 260 x 337 mm (10⅛ x 13¼ in)
Extra Large 2.40 kg (5.3 lb) | 280 x 356 mm (11 x 14 in)

ESAPI plates are the same size but slightly greater in weight.
Extra Small - 1.70 kg (3.75 lb)
Small - 2.08 kg (4.60 lb)
Medium - 2.50 kg (5.50 lb)
Large - 2.85 kg (6.30 lb)
Extra Large - 3.25 kg (7.20 lb)

Side SAPI (SSAPI) torso side plates, and their replacement, the Enhanced Side Ballistic Inserts (ESBI), have identical weights and dimensions. ESBI plates can be replaced with size X-Small ESAPI plates (by unfolding an extension built into the bottom of the ESBI Carrier assembly), if permitted by the unit commander.
 1 kg (2.3 lb) | 150 x 200 mm (6 x 8 in)

Physics 
The mechanism of effect lies in absorbing and dissipating the projectile's kinetic energy in local shattering of the ceramic plate and blunting the bullet material on the hard ceramic. The Spectra backing then spreads the energy of the impact to a larger area and stops the fragments, reducing the likelihood of fatal injury to the wearer. The same principle is used for the ceramic tiles used for the armored cockpits of some military airplanes, and the anti-spallation liners used in modern armored personnel carriers.

It is a false assumption that eliminating the penetration of a projectile into the body by using a personal armor system ensures that the wearer will not experience serious injury or death. Blunt force trauma can cause fatal damage to internal organs.

See also 
 Ceramic plate
 Tactical Vest Antenna System
 Ceramic armor
 Bulletproof vest
 List of body armor performance standards

References 

Body armor
United States Marine Corps equipment
Military equipment introduced in the 2000s